The Karl Jaspers Prize or Karl-Jaspers-Preis is a German philosophy award named after Karl Jaspers and awarded by the city of Heidelberg and the University of Heidelberg. It was first awarded in 1983 "for a scientific work of international significance supported by philosophical spirit". The Karl Jaspers Prize was initially endowed with 5,000 euros, though since 2013 this has increased to €25,000. Next to the Friedrich Nietzsche Prize it is one of the highest awards in Germany awarded exclusively for philosophical achievements.

Award winners

References

External links 
 

Philosophy of science
German literary awards
Philosophy awards